The Ratanarak family is a Chinese-Thai business family, which has extensive holdings in multiple industries. The family was founded by Chuan Ratanarak, who immigrated to Thailand in 1926 at the age of six. He founded the Bank of Ayudhya, Siam City Cement and Bangkok Broadcasting & TV. Chuan's son Krit inherited the leadership of these companies, and Krit's  son Chachchon is founder of the Tonson Group, the family's investment arm.

People
People with the surname Ratanarak include:

 Chachchon Ratanarak (born 1972), Thai businessman
 Chuan Ratanarak (1920–1993), Thai businessman
 Krit Ratanarak (born 1946), Thai businessman

References

 
Thai Chinese families
Business families of Thailand